Shofetim or Shoftim (—Hebrew for "judges," the first word in the parashah) is the 48th weekly Torah portion (parashah) in the annual Jewish cycle of Torah reading and the fifth in the Book of Deuteronomy. It comprises . The parashah provides a constitution—a basic societal structure—for the Israelites. The parashah sets out rules for judges, kings, Levites, prophets, cities of refuge, witnesses, war, and unsolved murders.

This parashah has 5590 letters, 1523 words, 97 verses, and 192 lines in a sefer Torah. Jews generally read it in August or September.

Readings
In traditional Sabbath Torah reading, the parashah is divided into seven aliyot or "readings". In the Masoretic Text, Parashat Shofetim has four "open portion" (petuchah) divisions (roughly equivalent to paragraphs, often abbreviated with the Hebrew letter  pe). Parashat Shofetim has several further subdivisions, called "closed portions" (setumah, abbreviated with the Hebrew letter  samekh) within the open portion divisions. The short first open portion divides the first reading. The long second open portion goes from the middle of the first reading to the middle of the fifth reading. The third open portion goes from the middle of the fifth reading to the middle of the seventh. The final, fourth open portion divides the seventh reading. Closed portion divisions further divide the first, fifth, and sixth aliyot, and each of the short second and third aliyot constitutes a closed portion of its own.

First reading—Deuteronomy 16:18–17:13
In the first reading, Moses directed the Israelites to appoint judges (shophṭim) and officials for their tribes to govern the people with justice, with impartiality, and without bribes. "Justice, justice shalt thou follow", he said. A closed portion ends here.

In the continuation of the reading, Moses warned the Israelites against setting up a sacred post beside God's altar or erecting a baetylus. A closed portion ends here with the end of chapter .

In the continuation of the reading, Moses warned the Israelites against the korban (sacrifice) of an ox or sheep with any serious congenital disorder. Another closed portion ends here.

And as the reading continues, Moses instructed that if the Israelites found a person who worshiped other gods—the sun, the moon, or other astronomical object—then they were to make a thorough inquiry, and if they established the fact on the testimony of two or more witnesses, then they were to stone the person to death, with the witnesses throwing the first stones. The first open portion ends here.

In the continuation of the reading, Moses taught that if a legal case proved too baffling for the Israelites to decide, then they were promptly to go to the place where the sanctuary was located, appear before the kohenim or judge in charge, and present their problem, and carry out any verdict that was announced there without deviating either to the right or to the left. They were to execute any man who presumptuously disregarded the priest or the judge, so that all the people would hear, be afraid, and not act presumptuously again. The first reading and a closed portion end here.

Second reading—Deuteronomy 17:14–20
In the second reading, Moses instructed that if, after the Israelites had settled the Land of Israel, they decided to set a king over them, they were to be free to do so, taking an Israelite chosen by God. The king was not to keep many horses, marry many wives, or amass excess silver and gold. The king was to write for himself a copy of this Teaching to remain with him and read all his life, so that he might learn to revere God and faithfully observe these laws. He would thus not act haughtily toward his people nor deviate from the law, and as a consequence, he and his descendants would enjoy a long reign. The second reading and a closed portion end here with the end of chapter .

Third reading—Deuteronomy 18:1–5
In the third reading, Moses explained that the Levites were to have no territorial portion, but were to live only on offerings, for God was to be their portion. In exchange for their service to God, the priests were to receive the shoulder, cheeks, and stomach of sacrifices, the first fruits of the Israelites' cereal, wine, oil, and the first sheep shearing. The third reading and a closed portion end here.

Fourth reading—Deuteronomy 18:6–13
In the fourth reading, Moses told that the country-based Levites were to be free to come from their settlements to the place that God chose as a shrine to serve with their fellow Levites based there, and there they were to receive equal shares of the dues. A closed portion ends here.

In the continuation of the reading, Moses instructed that the Israelites were not to imitate the abhorrent practices of the nations that they were displacing, consign their children to fire, or act as an augur, soothsayer, diviner, sorcerer, one who casts spells, one who consults ghosts or familiar spirits, or one who inquires of the dead, for it was because of those abhorrent acts that God was dispossessing the residents of the land. The fourth reading ends here.

Fifth reading—Deuteronomy 18:14–19:13
In the fifth reading, Moses foretold that God would raise a prophet from among them like Moses and the Israelites were to heed him. When at Mount Horeb, the Israelites had asked not to hear God's voice directly; God created the role of the prophet to speak God's words, promising to hold to account anybody who failed to heed the prophet's words. But any prophet who presumed to speak an oracle in God's name that God had not commanded, or who spoke in the name of other gods, was to die. This was how the people were to determine whether God spoke the oracle: If the prophet spoke in the name of God and the oracle did not come true, then God had not spoken that oracle, the prophet had uttered it presumptuously, and the people were not to fear him. A closed portion ends here with the end of chapter .

In the continuation of the reading, Moses instructed that when the Israelites had settled in the land, they were to divide the land into three parts and set aside three Cities of Refuge, so that any manslayer could have a place to which to flee. And if the Israelites faithfully observed all the law and God enlarged the territory, then they were to add three more towns to those three. Only a manslayer who had killed another unwittingly, without being the other's enemy, might flee there and live. For instance, if a man went with his neighbor into a grove to cut wood, and as he swung an axe, the axe-head flew off the handle and struck and killed the neighbor, then the man could flee to one of the cities of refuge and live. The second open portion ends here.

In the continuation of the reading, Moses instructed that if, however, one who was the enemy of another lay in wait, struck the other a fatal blow, and then fled to a city of refuge, the elders of the slayer's town were to have the slayer turned over to the blood-avenger to be put to death. The fifth reading and a closed portion end here.

Sixth reading—Deuteronomy 19:14–20:9
In the sixth reading, Moses warned that the Israelites were not to move their countrymen's landmarks, set up by previous generations, in the property that they were allotted in the land. A closed portion ends here.

In the continuation of the reading, Moses instructed that an Israelite could be found guilty of an offense only on the testimony of two or more witnesses. If one person gave false testimony against another, then the two parties were to appear before God and the priests or judges, the judges were to make a thorough investigation, and if they found the person to have testified falsely, then they were to do to the witness as the witness schemed to do to the other. A closed portion ends here with the end of chapter .

In the continuation of the reading, Moses taught that before the Israelites joined battle, the priest was to tell the troops not to fear, for God would accompany them. Then the officials were to ask the troops whether anyone had built a new house but not dedicated it, planted a vineyard but never harvested it, paid the bride-price for a wife but not yet married her, or become afraid and disheartened, and all these they were to send back to their homes.

Seventh reading—Deuteronomy 20:10–21:9
In the seventh reading, Moses instructed that when the Israelites approached to attack a town, they were to offer it terms of peace, and if the town surrendered, then all the people of the town were to serve the Israelites as slaves. But if the town did not surrender, then the Israelites were to lay siege to the town, and when God granted victory, kill all its men and take as booty the women, children, livestock, and everything else in the town. Those were the rules for towns that lay very far from Israel, but for the towns of the nations in the land—the Hittites, Amorites, Canaanites, Perizzites, Hivites, and Jebusites—the Israelites were to kill everyone, lest they lead the Israelites into doing all the abhorrent things that those nations had done for their gods. A closed portion ends here.

In the continuation of the reading, Moses instructed that when the Israelites besieged a city for a long time, they could eat the fruit of the city's trees, but they were not to cut down any trees that could yield food. The third open portion ends here with the end of chapter .

In the continuation of the reading, Moses taught that if, in the land, they found the body of a murder victim lying in the open, and they could not determine the killer, then the elders and judges were to measure the distances from the corpse to the nearby towns. The elders of the nearest town were to take a heifer that had never worked down to an ever-flowing wadi and break its neck. The priests were to come forward, and all the elders were to wash their hands over the heifer.

In the maftir reading of  that concludes the parashah, the elders were to declare that their hands did not shed the blood nor their eyes see it, and they were to ask God to absolve the Israelites, and not let guilt for the blood of the innocent remain among them, and God would absolve them of bloodguilt.  concludes the final closed portion.

Readings according to the triennial cycle
Jews who read the Torah according to the triennial cycle of Torah reading read the parashah according to the following schedule:

In ancient parallels
The parashah has parallels in these ancient sources:

Deuteronomy chapter 19

The Code of Hammurabi provided that if a man destroyed the eye of another man, they were to destroy his eye. If one broke a man's bone, they were to break his bone. If one destroyed the eye of a commoner or broke the bone of a commoner, he was to pay one mina of silver. If one destroyed the eye of a slave or broke a bone of a slave, he was to pay one-half the slave's price. If a man knocked out a tooth of a man of his own rank, they were to knock out his tooth. If one knocked out a tooth of a commoner, he was to pay one-third of a mina of silver. If a man struck a man's daughter and brought about a miscarriage, he was to pay 10 shekels of silver for her miscarriage. If the woman died, they were to put the man's daughter to death. If a man struck the daughter of a commoner and brought about a miscarriage, he was to pay five shekels of silver. If the woman died, he was to pay one-half of a mina of silver. If he struck a man's female slave and brought about a miscarriage, he was to pay two shekels of silver. If the female slave died, he was to pay one-third of a mina of silver.

In inner-biblical interpretation
The parashah has parallels or is discussed in these Biblical sources:

Deuteronomy chapters 12–26

Deuteronomy chapter 16
 instructs the Israelites to appoint judges and officers in all their cities. Similarly, 2 Chronicles  reports that Jehoshaphat appointed judges throughout all the fortified cities of Judah.

 requires fairness in the administration of justice. In the writings,  warns that a wicked person takes a gift to pervert the ways of justice.  states the rule most broadly, when Moses said simply, "You shall not judge unfairly."

Similarly,  prohibits showing partiality in judicial proceedings. Similarly,  and  say that to show partiality is not good.  reports that God has no iniquity or favoritism.

 addresses the practice of setting up a baetyl (matzeivah). In , Jacob took the stone on which he had slept, set it up as a baetyl (matzeivah), and poured oil on the top of it.  later directed the Israelites to break in pieces the Canaanites' baetyls (matzeivoteihem).  directed the Israelites not to rear up a baetyl and  prohibited them from setting up a baetyl, "which the Lord your God hates."

Deuteronomy chapter 17
The Torah addresses the need for corroborating witnesses three times:  instructs that a manslayer may be executed only on the evidence of two or more witnesses.  states the same multiple witness requirement for idolatry and all capital cases, and  applies the rule to all criminal offenses.  and  both state that the witnesses verifying wrongful worship of other gods shall also be the first to carry out the death sentence.

 assigns "the priests, the Levites" a judicial role. The Levites' role as judges also appears in Chronicles and Nehemiah. The Hebrew Bible also assigns to the Levites the duties of teaching the law, ministering before the Ark, singing, and blessing God's Name.

 sets out rules for kings. In 1 Samuel , the prophet Samuel warned what kings would do. The king would take the Israelites' sons to be horsemen, to serve with the king's chariots, to serve as officers, to plow the king's ground, to reap the harvest, and to make chariots and other instruments of war. The king would take the Israelites' daughters to be perfumers, cooks, and bakers. The king would take the Israelites' fields, vineyards, and olive yards and give them to his servants. The king would take the tenth part of the Israelites' seed, grapes, and flocks. The king would take the Israelites' servants and donkeys and put them to his work. The Israelites would be the king's servants.

 teaches that the king was not to keep many horses, marry many wives, or amass excess silver and gold. 1 Kings , however, reports that King Solomon accumulated riches exceeding all the kings of the earth, and that he received 660 talents—about 20 tons—of gold every year, in addition to that which came in taxes from the merchants, traders, and governors of the country.  reports that all the earth brought horses and mules to King Solomon, and he gathered together 1,400 chariots and 12,000 horsemen.  reports that King Solomon had 700 wives and 300 concubines, and his wives turned away his heart.

There is no specific text elsewhere in the Torah where this statement is recorded, but Samuel Driver suggested that "these actual words were still read in some part of the narrative of JE, extant at the time when Deuteronomy was composed’.

Deuteronomy chapter 18

The Pulpit Commentary explains that this was because "their participation in a semi-idolatrous service had disqualified them for the temple ministrations".

Christians like the professor J. Vernon McGee believe Deuteronomy 18:18 is a messianic prophecy of the Incarnation of Jesus Christ God in the womb of the Blessed Virgin Mary.

Deuteronomy chapter 19

Deuteronomy chapter 21

In early nonrabbinic interpretation
The parashah has parallels or is discussed in these early nonrabbinic sources:

Deuteronomy chapter 17
Philo called the rule that a judge should not receive the testimony of a single witness "an excellent commandment." Philo argued first that a person might inadvertently gain a false impression of a thing or be careless about observing and therefore be deceived. Secondly, Philo argued it unjust to trust to one witness against many persons, or indeed against only one individual, for why should the judge trust a single witness testifying against another, rather than the defendant pleading on the defendant's own behalf? Where there is no preponderance of opinion for guilt, Philo argued, it is best to suspend judgment.

Professor Lawrence Schiffman of New York University observed that the Damascus Document and the Temple Scroll of the Qumran sectarians appear to have interpreted , “Neither shall he multiply wives to himself,” to prohibit a king from having more than one wife, and thus that the sectarians felt that  intended that the king serve as an example against polygamy in the general population.

Deuteronomy chapter 20
Paraphrasing , Josephus reported that Moses told the Israelites that when they were about to go to war, they should send emissaries and heralds to those whom they had chosen to make enemies, for it was right to make use of words before weapons of war. The Israelites were to assure their enemies that although the Israelites had a numerous army, horses, weapons, and, above these, a merciful God ready to assist them, they nonetheless desired their enemies not to compel the Israelites to fight against them or to take from them what they had. And if the enemies heeded the Israelites, it would be proper for the Israelites to keep peace with the enemies. But if the enemies trusted in their own strength as superior to that of the Israelites and would not do the Israelites justice, then the Israelites were to lead their army against the enemies, making use of God as their supreme Commander.

In classical rabbinic interpretation
The parashah is discussed in these rabbinic sources from the era of the Mishnah and the Talmud:

Deuteronomy chapter 16
The Mishnah described three levels of courts: courts of 3 judges, courts of 23 judges, and a court of 71 judges, called the Great Sanhedrin. Courts of 23 judges heard cases involving capital punishment, persons or beasts charged with unnatural intercourse (as in ), an ox that gored a person (as in ), and wolves, lions, bears, leopards, hyenas, or snakes that killed a person. (Eliezer ben Hurcanus said that whoever killed such an animal, even without a trial, acquired merit, but Rabbi Akiva held that their death was to be decided by a court of 23.) A court of 71 heard cases involving a tribe that had gone astray after idol-worship, a false prophet (as in ), a High Priest, optional war (that is, all wars apart from the conquest of Canaan), additions to the city of Jerusalem or the Temple courtyards, institution of small sanhedrins (of 23) for the tribes, and condemnation of a city (as in ).

Rabbi Meir taught that courts of three judges heard defamation cases (as in ), but the Sages held that libel cases required a court of 23, as they could involve a capital charge (for if they found the woman guilty,  required that they stone her). Rabbi Meir taught that courts of three judges determined whether intercalation of an additional month to the year was needed, but Rabban Simeon ben Gamliel said that the matter was initiated by three, discussed by five, and determined by seven. The Mishnah held that if, however, it had been determined by only three, the determination held good. Simeon bar Yochai taught that courts of three judges performed the laying of the elders' hands on the head of a communal sacrifice (as in ) and the breaking of the heifer's neck (as in ), but Judah bar Ilai said courts of five judges did so. The Mishnah taught that three experts were required for the assessment of fourth-year fruit (as in ) and the second tithe (as in ) of unknown value, of consecrated objects for redemption purposes, and valuations of movable property the value of which had been vowed to the Sanctuary. According to Judah bar Ilai, one of them had to be a kohen. The Mishnah taught that 10 including a kohen were required in the case of valuation of real estate or a person.

Citing , "To do righteousness and justice is more acceptable to the Lord than sacrifice," a midrash taught that God told David that the justice and the righteousness that he did were more beloved to God than the Temple. The midrash noted that  does not say, "As much as sacrifice," but "More than sacrifice." The midrash explained that sacrifices were operative only so long as the Temple stood, but righteousness and justice hold good even when the Temple no longer stands.

Simeon ben Halafta told that once an ant dropped a grain of wheat, and all the ants came and sniffed at it, yet not one of them took it, until the one to whom it belonged came and took it. Simeon ben Halafta praised the ant's wisdom and praiseworthiness, inasmuch as the ant had not learned its ways from any other creature and had no judge or officer to guide it, as  says, the ant has "no chief, overseer, or ruler." How much more should people, who have judges and officers, hearken to them. Hence,  directs appointment of judges in all the Israelites' cities.

Rav Ashi said that such an appointment made in a place where there were scholars is as though planting the idolatrous tree beside the Altar, for  concludes "beside the altar of the Lord your God."

A Baraita reasoned that , “And you shall take no bribe,” cannot teach merely that one should not acquit the guilty nor convict the innocent due to a bribe, for  already says, “You shall not wrest judgment.” Rather,  teaches that even if a bribe is given to ensure that a judge acquit the innocent and convict the guilty,  nevertheless says, “And you shall take no bribe.” Thus it is prohibited for a judge to receive anything from litigants, even if there is no concern at all that justice will be perverted.

Rava (Abba ben Joseph bar Ḥama) taught that the reason for the prohibition against taking a bribe is that once a judge accepts a bribe from a party, the judge's thoughts draw closer to the party and the party becomes like the judge's own self, and one does not find fault with oneself. The Gemara noted that the term “bribe” (shochad) alludes to this idea, as it can be read as “as he is one” (shehu chad), that is, the judge is at one mind with the litigant. Rav Papa taught that judges should not judge cases involving those whom the judge loves (as the judge will not find any fault in them), nor involving those whom the judge hates (as the judge will not find any merit in them).

The Sages taught that it is not necessary to say that  precludes bribery by means of money, and even verbal bribery is also prohibited. The law that a bribe is not necessarily monetary was derived from the fact that  does not say: “And you shall take no profit.” The Gemara illustrated this by telling how Samuel was once crossing a river on a ferry and a certain man gave him a hand to help him out of the ferryboat. Samuel asked him what he was doing in the place, and when the man told Samuel that he had a case to present before Samuel, Samuel told him that he was disqualified from presiding over the case, as the man did Samuel a favor, and although no money changed hands, a bond had been formed between them. Similarly, the Gemara told that Amemar disqualified himself from presiding over the case of a person who removed a feather from Amemar's head, and Mar Ukva disqualified himself from presiding over the case of a person who covered spittle that was lying before Mar Ukva.

And if a defendant has departed from a court with a judgment of guilt, the court does still have the ability to call the defendant back to reach a judgment of innocence. Similarly, the Rabbis taught in a Baraita that the words "Justice, justice shall you pursue" mean that one should pursue the most respected jurist to the place where the jurist holds court. The Rabbis also taught a Baraita that the words "Justice, justice shall you pursue" meant that one should follow sages to their academies.

For example, where two boats meet on a narrow river headed in opposite directions, if both attempted to pass at the same time, both would sink, but if one made way for the other, both could pass without mishap. Similarly, if two camels met on the ascent to Bethoron, if they both ascended at the same time, both could fall into the valley, but if they ascended one after another, both could ascend safely. These were the principles by which the travelers were to resolve their impasse: If one was loaded and the other unloaded, then the unloaded was to give way to the loaded. If one was nearer to its destination than the other, then the nearer was to give way to the farther. If they were equally near to their destinations, then they were to compromise and the one that went first was to compensate the one who gave way. The Sages taught that , "Justice, justice, shall you follow," teaches that one should follow the best, most prestigious, court of the generation. For example, follow after Rabbi Eliezer to Lod, after Rabban Yoḥanan ben Zakkai to Beror Ḥayil.

Samuel ben Nahman taught in the name of Rabbi Jonathan that when a judge unjustly takes the possessions of one and gives them to another, God takes that judge's life, as  says: "Rob not the poor because he is poor; neither oppress the afflicted in the gate, for the Lord will plead their cause, and will despoil of life those that despoil them." Samuel bar Nahman also taught in the name of Rabbi Jonathan that judges should always think of themselves as if they had a sword hanging over them and Gehenna gaping under them, as Song of Songs  says: "Behold, it is the litter of Solomon; 60 mighty men are about it, of the mighty men of Israel. They all handle the sword, and are expert in war; every man has his sword upon his thigh, because of dread in the night."

The Sifre deduced from the words "You shall not plant an Asherah of any kind of tree beside the altar of the Lord your God" in  that planting a tree on the Temple Mount would violate a commandment. Rabbi Eliezer ben Jacob deduced from the prohibition against any kind of tree beside the altar in  that wooden columns were not allowed in the Temple courtyard. The Gemara explained that it was not permitted to build with wood near the altar. Rav Chisda, however, taught that baetyls were permitted.

Deuteronomy chapter 17
The Mishnah taught that a court would examine witnesses in capital cases with seven questions: (1) In which cycle of seven years within a jubilee did the event occur? (2) In which year of the Sabbatical cycle did the event occur? (3) In which month did the event occur? (4) On which day of the month did the event occur? (5) On which day of the week did the event occur? (6) At which hour did the event occur? And (7) in what place did the event occur? Rabbi Yosei said that the court would examine the witnesses with only three questions: On which day did the event occur, at which hour, and in what place?

The Mishnah questioned why  discussed three witnesses, when two witnesses were sufficient to establish guilt. The Mishnah deduced that the language of  meant to analogize between a set of two witnesses and a set of three witnesses. Just as three witnesses could discredit two witnesses, two witnesses could discredit three witnesses. The Mishnah deduced from the multiple use of the word "witnesses" in  that two witnesses could discredit even a hundred witnesses. Rabbi Simeon deduced from the multiple use of the word "witnesses" in  that just as two witnesses were not executed as perjurers until both had been incriminated, so three were not executed until all three had been incriminated. Rabbi Akiva concluded that if Scripture so penalized an accomplice just as one who committed a wrong, how much more would God reward an accomplice to a good deed. The Mishnah further deduced from the multiple use of the word "witnesses" in  that just as the disqualification of one of two witnesses would invalidate the evidence of the set of two witnesses, so would the disqualification of one witness invalidate the evidence of even a hundred. Jose ben Halafta said that these limitations applied only to witnesses in capital charges, and that in monetary suits, the balance of the witnesses could establish the evidence. Judah the Prince said that the same rule applied to monetary suits or capital charges where the disqualified witnesses joined to take part in the warning of the defendant, but the rule did not disqualify the remaining witnesses where the disqualified witnesses did not take part in the warning. The Gemara further qualified the Mishnah's ruling.

The Mishnah reported that they admonished witnesses in capital cases not to testify based on conjecture (that is, circumstantial evidence) or hearsay, for the court would scrutinize the witnesses' evidence by cross-examination and inquiry. The Gemara reported that the Rabbis taught that the words "based on conjecture" in the Mishnah meant that the judge told the witness that if the witness saw the defendant running after the victim into a ruin, and the witness pursued the defendant and found the defendant with bloody sword in hand and the victim writhing in agony, then the judge would tell the witness that the witness saw nothing (and did not actually witness a murder). It was taught in a Baraita that Rabbi Simeon ben Shetach said that he once did see a man pursuing his fellow into a ruin, and when Rabbi Simeon ben Shetach ran after the man and saw him, bloody sword in hand and the murdered man writhing, Rabbi Simeon ben Shetach exclaimed to the man, "Wicked man, who slew this man? It is either you or I! But what can I do, since your blood (that is, life) does not rest in my hands, for it is written in the Torah (in ) 'At the mouth of two witnesses . . . shall he who is to die be put to death'? May He who knows one's thoughts (that is, God) exact vengeance from him who slew his fellow!" The Gemara reported that before they moved from the place, a serpent bit the murderer and he died.

The Gemara read the Torah's requirement for corroborating witnesses to limit the participation of witnesses and Rabbinical students in trials. The Mishnah taught that in monetary cases, all may argue for or against the defendant, but in capital cases, all may argue in favor of the defendant, but not against the defendant. The Gemara asked whether the reference to "all" in this Mishnah included even the witnesses. Jose b. Judah and the Rabbis disagreed to some degree. Jose b. Judah taught that a witness could argue for acquittal, but not for condemnation. Rav Papa taught that the word "all" means to include not the witnesses, but the Rabbinical students who attended trials, and thus was not inconsistent with the views of Jose b. Judah or of the Rabbis. The Gemara explained the reasoning of Jose b. Judah for his view that witnesses may argue in favor of the accused as follows:  says, "But one witness shall not testify against any person that he die." Hence, according to the reasoning of Jose b. Judah, only "so that he die" could the witness not argue, but the witness could argue for acquittal. Shimon ben Lakish explained the reasoning of the Rabbis forbidding a witness to argue in favor of the accused as follows: the Rabbis reasoned that if a witness could argue the case, then the witness might seem personally concerned in his testimony (for a witness contradicted by subsequent witnesses could be subject to execution for testifying falsely). The Gemara then asked how the Rabbis interpreted the words, "so that he die" (which seems to indicate that the witness may not argue only when it leads to death). The Gemara explained that the Rabbis read those words to apply to the Rabbinical students (constraining the students not to argue for condemnation). A Baraita taught that they did not listen to a witnesses who asked to make a statement in the defendant's favor, because  says, "But one witness shall not testify." They did not listen to a Rabbinical student who asked to argue a point to the defendant's disadvantage, because  says, "One shall not testify against any person that he die" (but a student could do so for acquittal).

Rabbi Jose said that a malefactor was never put to death unless two witnesses had duly pre-admonished the malefactor, as  prescribes, “At the mouth of two witnesses or three witnesses shall he that is worthy of death be put to death.” And the Mishnah reported another interpretation of the words, “At the mouth of two witnesses,” was that the Sanhedrin would not hear evidence from the mouth of an interpreter.

Rav Zutra bar Tobiah reported that Rav reasoned that  disqualified isolated testimony when it prescribes that “at the mouth of one witness he shall not be put to death.” This special admonition against one witness would seem redundant to the earlier context, “At the mouth of two witnesses or three witnesses shall he that is worthy of death be put to death,” so it was taken to mean that individual witnesses who witnesses the crime, one by one, in isolation from each other, were insufficient to convict. Similarly, a Baraita taught that  prescribes, “At the mouth of one witness he shall not be put to death,” to cover instances where two persons see the wrongdoer, one from one window and the other from another window, without seeing each other, in which case the evidence could not be joined to form a set of witnesses sufficient to convict. Even if they both witnessed the offence from the same window, one after the other, their testimony could not be joined to form a set of witnesses sufficient to convict.

Rabbi Ishmael the son of Rabbi Jose commanded Rabbi Judah the Prince not to engage in a lawsuit against three parties, for one would be an opponent and the other two would be witnesses for the other side.

The Rabbis explained that God commanded Moses to carve two tablets in  because they were to act as witnesses between God and Israel. The two tablets corresponded to the two witnesses whom  and  require to testify to a cause, to two groomsmen, to bridegroom and bride, to heaven and earth, to this world and the world to come.

Rabbi Ḥiyya taught that the righteous dead remain aware of the actions of the living, while the wicked dead do not, reading to that effect , "For the living know that they will die, and the dead know nothing." To support his argument, Rabbi Ḥiyya cited , "At the mouth of two witnesses or three witnesses the dead shall be put to death," which refers to the condemned sinner as "the dead." Rabbi Ḥiyya read  to teach that Scripture considers the wicked person dead from the outset because of the wicked person's sin.

Who were the judges in the court described in ? The Mishnah taught that the High Priest could serve as a judge. But the King could not. When a vacancy arose, a new judge was appointed from the first row of scholars who sat in front of the judges.

 instructs, "you shall come . . . to the judge who shall be in those days," but how could a person go to a judge who was not in that person's days? The Rabbis taught in a Baraita that  employs the words "who shall be in those days" to show that one must be content to go to the judge who is in one's days, and accept that judge's authority. The Rabbis taught that Ecclesiastes  conveys a similar message when it says, "Say not, 'How was it that the former days were better than these?'"

The Sages based their authority to legislate rules equally binding with those laid down in the Torah on the words of  "According to the law that they shall teach you . . . you shall do; you shall not turn aside from the sentence that they shall declare to you."

The Mishnah recounted a story that demonstrated the authority of the court in —that one must follow the rulings of the court and "not turn . . . to the right hand, nor to the left." After two witnesses testified that they saw the new moon at its proper time (on the thirtieth day of the month shortly before nightfall), Rabban Gamaliel (the president of the Great Sanhedrin in Jerusalem) accepted their evidence and ruled that a new month had begun. But later at night (after the nightfall with which the thirty-first day of the earlier month would have begun), when the new moon should have been clearly visible, no one saw the new moon. Rabbi Dosa ben Harkinas declared the two witnesses to be false witnesses, comparing their testimony to that of witnesses who testify that a woman bore a child, when on the next day her belly was still swollen. Rabbi Joshua told Rabbi Dosa that he saw the force of his argument. Rabban Gamaliel then ordered Rabbi Joshua to appear before Rabban Gamaliel with his staff and money on the day which according to Rabbi Joshua's reckoning would be Yom Kippur. (According to Rabbi Joshua's reckoning, Yom Kippur would fall a day after the date that it would fall according to Rabban Gamaliel's reckoning. And  prohibited carrying a staff and money on Yom Kippur.) Rabbi Akiva then found Rabbi Joshua in great distress (agonizing over whether to obey Rabban Gamaliel's order to do what Rabbi Joshua considered profaning Yom Kippur). Rabbi Akiva told Rabbi Joshua that he could prove that whatever Rabban Gamaliel ordered was valid. Rabbi Akiva cited , which says, "These are the appointed seasons of the Lord, holy convocations, which you shall proclaim in their appointed seasons," which is to say that whether they are proclaimed at their proper time or not, God has no appointed seasons other than those that are proclaimed. Rabbi Joshua then went to Rabbi Dosa, who told Rabbi Joshua that if they called into question the decisions of the court of Rabban Gamaliel, then they would have to call into question the decisions of every court since the days of Moses. For  says, "Then Moses and Aaron, Nadab and Abihu, and 70 of the elders of Israel went up," and  does not mention the names of the elders to show that every group of three that has acted as a court over Israel is on a level with the court of Moses (as most of the members of that court also bore names without distinction). Rabbi Joshua then took his staff and his money and went to Rabban Gamaliel on the day that Rabbi Joshua reckoned was Yom Kippur. Rabban Gamaliel rose and kissed Rabbi Joshua on his head and said, "Come in peace, my teacher and my disciple—my teacher in wisdom and my disciple because you have accepted my decision."

Three courts of law sat in Jerusalem: one at the entrance to the Temple Mount, a second at the door of the Temple Court, and the third, the Great Sanhedrin, in the Hall of Hewn Stones in the Temple Court. The dissenting elder and the other members of the local court with whom the elder disputed went to the court at the entrance to the Temple Mount, and the elder stated what the elder and the elder's colleagues expounded. If the first court had heard a ruling on the matter, then the court stated it. If not, the litigants and the judges went to the second court, at the entrance of the Temple Court, and the elder once again declared what the elder and the elder's colleagues expounded. If this second court had heard a ruling on the matter, then this court stated it. If not, then they all proceeded to the Great Sanhedrin at the Hall of Hewn Stones, which issued instruction to all Israel, for  said that "they shall declare to you from that place that the Lord shall choose," meaning the Temple. But if one of the elder's disciples issued a decision opposed to the Great Sanhedrin, the disciple was exempt from judgment, for the very stringency that kept the disciple from having yet been ordained served as a source of leniency to prevent the disciple from being found to be a rebellious elder.

Rules for kings

The Mishnah taught that the king could lead the army to a voluntary war on the decision of a court of 71. He could force a way through private property, and none could stop him. There was no limit to the size of the king's road. And he had first choice of the plunder taken by the people in war.

The Rabbis disagreed about the powers of the king. Rabbi Nehorai, on the other hand, said that  did not command the Israelites to choose a king, but was spoken only in anticipation of the Israelites' future complaints, as  says, "And (you) shall say, 'I will set a king over me.'"

The Mishnah taught that the king could neither judge nor be judged, testify nor be testified against. The king could not perform the ceremony to decline Levirate marriage (chalizah) nor could the ceremony be performed to his wife. The king could not perform the duty of a brother in Levirate marriage (yibbum), nor could that duty be performed to his wife. Rabbi Judah taught that if the king wished to perform halizah or yibbum, he would be remembered for good. But the rabbis taught that even if he wished to do so, he was not listened to, and no one could marry his widow. Rabbi Judah taught that a king could marry a king's widow, for David married the widow of Saul, as  reports, "And I gave you your master's house and your master's wives to your bosom."

 says that "the Lord your God shall choose" the Israelite king. Hanan bar Rava said in the name of Rav that even the superintendent of a well is appointed in Heaven, as  says that God is "sovereign over every leader."

Judah said that he could have more wives, provided that they did not turn away his heart. But Simeon said that he must not marry even one wife who would turn away his heart. The Mishnah concluded that  prohibited the king from marrying more than 18 wives, even if they were all as righteous as Abigail the wife of David. The Gemara noted that Judah did not always employ the rationale behind a Biblical passage as a basis for limiting its legal effect, as he did here in Mishnah Sanhedrin 2:4. The Gemara explained that Rabbi Judah employed the rationale behind the law here because  itself expounds the rationale behind its legal constraint: The reason behind the command, "he shall not multiply wives to himself," is so "that his heart be not turned aside." Thus Rabbi Judah reasoned that  itself restricts the law to these conditions, and a king could have more wives if "his heart be not turned aside." The Gemara noted that Simeon did not always interpret a Biblical passage strictly by its plain meaning, as he appeared to do here in Mishnah Sanhedrin 2:4. The Gemara explained that Simeon could have reasoned that  adds the words, "that his heart turn not away," to imply that the king must not marry even a single wife who might turn away his heart. And one could interpret the words "he shall not multiply" to mean that the king must not marry many wives even if they, like Abigail, would never turn away his heart. The Gemara then analyzed how the anonymous first view in Mishnah Sanhedrin 2:4 came to its conclusion that the king could have no more than 18 wives. The Gemara noted that  refers to the children of six of David's wives born to David in Hebron. The Gemara reasoned that the prophet Nathan referred to these six wives in  when he said, "And if that were too little, then would I add to you the like of these, and the like of these," each "these" implying six more wives. Thus with the original six, these two additions of six would make 18 in all.

Deuteronomy chapter 18

Rules for Levites
The interpreters of Scripture by symbol taught that the deeds of Phinehas explained why  directed that the priests were to receive the foreleg, cheeks, and stomach of sacrifices. The foreleg represented the hand of Phinehas, as  reports that Phinehas "took a spear in his hand." The cheeks' represent the prayer of Phinehas, as  reports, "Then Phinehas stood up and prayed, and so the plague was stayed." The stomach was to be taken in its literal sense, for  reports that Phinehas "thrust . . . the woman through her belly."

Tractate Terumot in the Mishnah, Tosefta, and Jerusalem Talmud interpreted the laws of the first of one's grain, wine, and oil that  and  required one to give to a Priest.

Rules for prophets

Rabbi Assi taught that the children of Noah were also prohibited to do anything stated in  "There shall not be found among you any one that makes his son or his daughter to pass through the fire, one that uses divination, a soothsayer, or an enchanter, or a sorcerer, or a charmer, or one that consults a ghost or a familiar spirit, or a necromancer."

But if the offender merely created illusions, the offender was not put to death. Rabbi Akiva said in Rabbi Joshua's name that two may gather cucumbers by "magic," and one was to be punished and the other was to be exempt. The one who actually gathered the cucumbers by magic was to be punished, while the one who performed an illusion was exempt.

An "augurer" was one who took hold of a staff and said, "Whether I should go or not." Rabbi Ishmael said that a "soothsayer" was someone who passed something over his eye. Rabbi Akiva said that soothsayers calculated the seasons, as did those who declared that the years prior to the seventh year produced good wheat or bad beans. The Sages said soothsayers were those who performed illusions. The Sifre defined "diviners" as people who said that something could be divined from, for example, bread falling from someone's mouth, a staff falling from someone's hand, a snake passing on one's right or a fox on one's left, a deer stopping on the way before someone, or the coming of the new moon. The Sifre taught that a "sorcerer" was someone who actually carried out a deed, not merely performing an illusion.

Johanan bar Nappaha taught that sorcerers are called , kashefim, because they seek to contradict the power of Heaven. Rabbi Hanina interpreted  to teach that even sorcerers have no power to oppose God's will. A woman once tried to take earth from under Rabbi Hanina's feet (so as to perform sorcery against him). Rabbi Hanina told her that if she could succeed in her attempts, she should go ahead, but (he was not concerned, for)  says, "There is none else beside Him." But the Gemara asked whether Johanan bar Nappaha had not taught that sorcerers are called , kashfim, because they (actually) contradict the power of Heaven. The Gemara answered that Rabbi Hanina was in a different category, owing to his abundant merit (and therefore Heaven protected him).

In , Moses foretold that "A prophet will the Lord your God raise up for you, from your midst, of your brethren." The Sifre deduced from the words "for you" that God would not raise up a prophet for other nations. The Sifre deduced from the words "from your midst" that a prophet could not come from abroad. The Sifre deduced from the words "of your brethren" that a prophet could not be an outsider.

In , Moses foretold that "A prophet will the Lord your God raise up for you ... like me," and Johanan bar Nappaha thus taught that prophets would have to be, like Moses, strong, wealthy, wise, and meek. Strong, for  says of Moses, "he spread the tent over the tabernacle," and a Master taught that Moses himself spread it, and  reports, "Ten cubits shall be the length of a board." Wealthy, as  reports God's instruction to Moses, "Carve yourself two tablets of stone," and the Rabbis interpreted the verse to teach that the chips would belong to Moses. Wise, for Rav and Samuel both said that 50 gates of understanding were created in the world, and all but one were given to Moses, for  said of Moses, "You have made him a little lower than God." Meek, for  reports, "Now the man Moses was very meek."

The Mishnah taught that the community was to execute a false prophet within the meaning of —one who prophesied what the prophet had not heard or what was not told to the prophet. But Heaven alone would see to the death of the person who suppressed a prophecy or disregarded the words of a prophet, or a prophet who transgressed the prophet's own word. The Mishnah taught that only a court of 71 members (the Great Sanhedrin) could try a false prophet.

The Mishnah taught that the community was to execute by strangulation a false prophet and one who prophesied in the name of an idol. The Mishnah taught that one who prophesied in the name of an idol was subject to execution by strangulation even if the prophecy chanced upon the correct law.

A Baraita taught that prophecy died when the later prophets Haggai, Zechariah, and Malachi died, and the Divine Spirit departed from Israel. But Jews could still on occasion hear echoes of a Heavenly Voice (Bat Kol).

Deuteronomy chapter 19

Cities of refuge

The Mishnah taught that those who killed in error went into banishment. One would go into banishment if, for example, while one was pushing a roller on a roof, the roller slipped over, fell, and killed someone. One would go into banishment if while one was lowering a cask, it fell down and killed someone. One would go into banishment if while coming down a ladder, one fell and killed someone. But one would not go into banishment if while pulling up the roller it fell back and killed someone, or while raising a bucket the rope snapped and the falling bucket killed someone, or while going up a ladder one fell down and killed someone. The Mishnah's general principle was that whenever the death occurred in the course of a downward movement, the culpable person went into banishment, but if the death did not occur in the course of a downward movement, the person did not go into banishment. If while chopping wood, the iron slipped from the ax handle and killed someone, Rabbi taught that the person did not go into banishment, but the sages said that the person did go into banishment. If from the split log rebounding killed someone, Rabbi said that the person went into banishment, but the sages said that the person did not go into banishment.

Rabbi Jose bar Judah taught that to begin with, they sent a slayer to a city of refuge, whether the slayer killed intentionally or not. Then the court sent and brought the slayer back from the city of refuge. The Court executed whomever the court found guilty of a capital crime, and the court acquitted whomever the court found not guilty of a capital crime. The court restored to the city of refuge whomever the court found liable to banishment, as  ordained, "The congregation shall restore him to the city of refuge from where he had fled."  also says, "The manslayer . . . shall dwell therein until the death of the High Priest, who was anointed with the holy oil," but the Mishnah taught that the death of a High Priest who had been anointed with the holy anointing oil, the death of a High Priest who had been consecrated by the many vestments, or the death of a High Priest who had retired from his office each equally made possible the return of the slayer. Rabbi Judah said that the death of a priest who had been anointed for war also permitted the return of the slayer. Because of these laws, mothers of High Priests would provide food and clothing for the slayers in cities of refuge so that the slayers might not pray for the High Priest's death. If the High Priest died at the conclusion of the slayer's trial, the slayer did not go into banishment. If, however, the High Priests died before the trial was concluded and another High Priest was appointed in his stead and then the trial concluded, the slayer returned home after the new High Priest's death.

A Midrash catalogued the wide range of additional capabilities of the heart reported in the Hebrew Bible. The heart speaks, sees, hears, walks, falls, stands, rejoices, cries, is comforted, is troubled, becomes hardened, grieves, fears, can be broken, becomes proud, rebels, invents, cavils, overflows, devises, desires, goes astray, lusts, is refreshed, can be stolen, is humbled, is enticed, errs, trembles, is awakened, loves, hates, envies, is searched, is rent, meditates, is like a fire, is like a stone, turns in repentance, dies, melts, takes in words, is susceptible to fear, gives thanks, covets, becomes hard, makes merry, acts deceitfully, speaks from out of itself, loves bribes, writes words, plans, receives commandments, acts with pride, makes arrangements, and aggrandizes itself.

And just as  says, “The Lord is righteous,” we, too, should be righteous.

Landmarks
(Thus, one should not plant so near to one's neighbor's border that one's plants' roots draw sustenance from the neighbor's land, thus impoverishing it.) The Gemara further cited this analysis for the proposition that one may rely on the Rabbis' agricultural determinations.

The Sifre asked why  says, "You shall not remove your neighbor's landmark," when  already says, "You shall not rob." The Sifre explained that  teaches that one who removes a neighbor's boundary mark violates two negative commandments. The Sifre further explained that lest one think that this conclusion applies outside the Land of Israel,  says, "in your inheritance that you will inherit in the land," indicating that only in the Land of Israel would one violate two negative commandments. The Sifre further taught that one violates the command of  not to move a neighbor's landmark (1) if one moves an Israelite's landmark, (2) if one substitutes the statement of Eliezer ben Hurcanus for that of Rabbi Joshua or vice versa, or (3) if one sells a burial plot purchased by an ancestor.

The Mishnah taught that one who prevents the poor from gleaning, or allows one but not another to glean, or helps one poor person but not another to glean is deemed to be a robber of the poor. Concerning such a person  said, "Remove not the landmark of those who came up."

Rules for witnesses

The Mishnah taught how they punished perjurers where they could not punish the perjurers with the punishment that the perjurers sought to inflict. If the perjurers testified that a priest was a son of a divorcee (thus disqualifying the son as a priest) or the son of a woman who had been declined in Levirate marriage (a woman who had received halizah, once again disqualifying the son as a priest), they did not order that each perjurer be stigmatized as born of a divorcee or a woman declined in Levirate marriage. Rather, they gave the perjurer 40 lashes. If the perjurers testified that a person was guilty of a charge punishable by banishment, they did not banish the perjurers. Rather, they gave the perjurer 40 lashes.

The Mishnah taught that if perjurers testified that a man divorced his wife and had not paid her ketubah, seeing that her ketubah would ultimately have to be paid sooner or later, the assessment was made based on the value of the woman's ketubah in the event of her being widowed or divorced or, alternatively, her husband inheriting her after her death. If perjurers testified that a debtor owed a creditor 1,000 zuz due within 30 days, while the debtor says that the debt was due in 10 years, the assessment of the fine is made on the basis of how much one might be willing to offer for the difference between holding the sum of 1,000 zuz to be repaid in 30 days or in 10 years.

If witnesses testified that a person owed a creditor 200 zuz, and the witnesses turned out to have perjured themselves, then Rabbi Meir taught that they flogged the perjurers and ordered the perjurers to pay corresponding damages, because  (20:13 in the NJPS) sanctions the flogging and  sanctions the compensation. But the Sages said that one who paid damages was not flogged.

But the Sages said that they received only 40 lashes.

The Mishnah taught that a group of convicted perjurers divided monetary penalties among themselves, but penalties of lashes were not divided among offenders. Thus if the perjurers testified that a person owed a friend 200 zuz, and they were found to have committed perjury, the court divided the damages proportionately among the perjurers. But if the perjurers testified that a person was liable to a flogging of 40 lashes, and they were found to have committed perjury, then each perjurer received 40 lashes.

The Mishnah taught that they did not condemn witnesses as perjurers until other witnesses directly incriminated the first witnesses. Thus if the first witnesses testified that one person killed another, and other witnesses testified that the victim or the alleged murderer was with the other witnesses on that day in a particular place, then they did not condemn the first witnesses as perjurers. But if the other witnesses testified that the first witnesses were with the other witnesses on that day in a particular place, then they did condemn the first witnesses as perjurers and executed the first witnesses on the other witnesses' evidence.

The Mishnah taught that if a second set of witnesses came and charged the first witnesses with perjury, and then a third set of witnesses came and charged them with perjury, even if a hundred witnesses did so, they were all to be executed. Rabbi Judah said that this demonstrated a conspiracy, and they executed only the first set of witnesses.

The Mishnah taught that they did not execute perjurers in a capital case until after the conclusion of the trial of the person against whom they testified. The (Pharisee) Sages noted that  says, "then shall you do to him as he purposed to do to his brother," implying that his brother was still alive. The Sages thus asked what "life for life" meant. The Sages taught that one might have thought that perjurers were liable to be executed from the moment that they delivered their perjured testimony, so  says "life for life" to instruct that perjurers were not to be put to death until after the conclusion of the trial.

The Gemara taught that the words "eye for eye" in  meant pecuniary compensation. Simeon bar Yochai asked those who would take the words literally how they would enforce equal justice where a blind man put out the eye of another man, or an amputee cut off the hand of another, or where a lame person broke the leg of another. Abaye reported that a sage of the school of Hezekiah taught that  said "eye for eye" and "life for life," but not "life and eye for eye," and it could sometimes happen that eye and life would be taken for an eye, as when the offender died while being blinded. Rav Papa said in the name of Rava that  referred explicitly to healing, and the verse would not make sense if one assumed that retaliation was meant. As the latter case plainly indicated pecuniary compensation, so must the former.

Deuteronomy chapter 20

Rules for war

The Mishnah taught that when the High Priest anointed for battle addressed the people, he spoke in Hebrew. The High Priest continued, saying that the Philistines came relying upon the might of Goliath, and his fate was to fall by the sword, and the Philistines fell with him. The Ammonites came relying upon the might of their captain Shobach, but his fate was to fall by the sword, and the Ammonites fell with him.

Rabbi Akiva taught that one should understand "fearful and fainthearted" literally—the conscript was unable to stand in the battle-ranks and see a drawn sword. Rabbi Jose the Galilean, however, taught that the words "fearful and fainthearted" alluded to those who feared because of the transgressions that they had committed. Therefore, the Torah connected the fearful and fainthearted with those who had built a new house, planted a vineyard, or become engaged, so that the fearful and fainthearted might return home on their account. (Otherwise, those who claimed exemption because of sinfulness would have to expose themselves publicly as transgressors.) Rabbi Jose counted among the fearful and fainthearted a High Priest who married a widow, an ordinary priest who married a divorcee or a woman who had been declined in Levirate marriage (a woman who had received chalitzah), and a lay Israelite who married the child of an illicit union (a mamzer) or a Gibeonite.

Similarly, reading , a Midrash exclaimed how great the power of peace is, for God directed that we should offer peace even to antagonists. Thus the Sages taught that we must inquire about the welfare of other nations in order to keep the peace.

Citing , Rabbi Joshua of Siknin said in the name of Rabbi Levi that God agreed to whatever Moses decided.

The Girgashites vacated their land and thus merited receiving land in Africa.

Simeon taught that if people of the nations then repented, they would be accepted. Rabbah b. Shela taught that Rabbi Simeon's reason for teaching that the Israelites inscribed the Torah on the plaster was because  says, "And the peoples shall be as the burnings of plaster." That is, the people of the other nations would burn on account of the matter on the plaster (and because they failed to follow the teachings written on the plaster). Rabbi Judah, however, taught that the Israelites inscribed the Torah directly on the stones, as  says, "You shall write upon the stones all the words of this law," and after that they plastered them over with plaster. Rabbi Simeon asked Rabbi Judah how then the people of that time learned the Torah (as the inscription would have been covered with plaster). Rabbi Judah replied that God endowed the people of that time with exceptional intelligence, and they sent their scribes, who peeled off the plaster and carried away a copy of the inscription. On that account, the verdict was sealed for them to descend into the pit of destruction, because it was their duty to learn Torah, but they failed to do so. Rabbi Judah explained  to mean that their destruction would be like plaster: Just as there is no other remedy for plaster except burning (for burning is the only way to obtain plaster), so there was no remedy for those nations (who cleave to their abominations) other than burning.

Deuteronomy chapter 21
Babylonian Talmud Sotah 44b–47b, in, e.g., Talmud Bavli: Tractate Sotah: Volume 2, elucidated by Eliezer Herzka, et al., volume 33b, pages 44b4–47b3.</ref>

Eliezer ben Hurcanus ruled that the calf (eglah) prescribed in  had to be no more than one year old and the red cow (parah) prescribed in  had to be two years old. But the Sages ruled that the calf could be even two years old and the red cow could be three or four years old. Rabbi Meir ruled that the red cow could be even five years old, but they did not wait with an older cow, as it might in the meantime grow some black hairs and thus become invalid.

Johanan ben Saul asked why  required that they should bring a calf (eglah) into a ravine. Johanan ben Saul explained that God provided that something that had not borne fruit would have its neck broken in a place that was not fertile to atone for one who would no longer be able to produce fruit. The Gemara asked then what the word "fruit" meant in the context of the murder victim, for if one interpreted it to mean "children," then according to that argument, the ceremony would not apply if the murder victim had been old or castrated. Therefore, the Gemara concluded, one must understand "fruit" to mean the performance of commandments (that the murdered person would no longer be able to fulfill).

Reading , "And He said to him: 'Take me a heifer of three years old (meshuleshet), a she-goat of three years old (meshuleshet), and a ram of three years old (meshulash),'" a Midrash read , meshuleshet, to mean “three-fold” or “three kinds,” indicating sacrifices for three different purposes. The Midrash deduced that God thus showed Abraham three kinds of bullocks, three kinds of goats, and three kinds of rams that Abraham's descendants would need to sacrifice. The three kinds of bullocks were: (1) the bullock that  would require the Israelites to sacrifice on the Day of Atonement (Yom Kippur), (2) the bullock that  would require the Israelites to bring on account of unwitting transgression of the law, and (3) the heifer whose neck  would require the Israelites to break.

A Midrash told that when the Patriarch Joseph was young, he used to study Torah with Jacob. Jacob told the brothers that if Joseph gave them a sign of which subject Joseph and Jacob had last studied together, then Jacob would believe them. Joseph too had remembered what subject they had been studying, so (as  reports) he sent Jacob wagons (agalot) so that Jacob might know that the gift came from him. The Midrash thus concluded that wherever Joseph went he studied the Torah, just as his forebears did, even though the Torah had not yet been given.

The Gemara employed  to deduce that one may not benefit from a corpse. Just as one was prohibited to benefit from the heifer, so also one was thus prohibited to benefit from a corpse. The School of Rabbi Yannai taught that one was prohibited to benefit from the heifer because  mentions forgiveness (kaper) in connection with the heifer, just as atonement (kaper) is mentioned in connection with sacrifices (for example in ). (Just as one was prohibited to benefit from sacrifices, so also one was thus prohibited to benefit from the heifer.)

The Mishnah taught that when murderers multiplied, the ceremony of breaking a heifer's neck was discontinued. The Rabbis taught in a Baraita that when murderers multiplied, the ceremony of breaking a heifer's neck was discontinued, because the ceremony was performed only in a case of uncertainty about who the murderer was; but when murderers multiplied openly, the ceremony of breaking a heifer's neck was discontinued (because the identity of murderers was no longer uncertain).

In medieval Jewish interpretation
The parashah is discussed in these medieval Jewish sources:

Deuteronomy chapter 17
Reading , "if there arise a matter too hard for you in judgment, between blood and blood, between plea and plea, between affliction and affliction . . . you shall do according to the sentence which they declare to you," Baḥya ibn Paquda noted that the subjects included are things that need to be detailed, distinguished, and discussed by the method of Tradition, and not by that of logical demonstration from reason alone. He contrasted the roots of the religion and duties that can be fulfilled through reason and recognition, with regard to which he deduced a duty to reflect and investigate with one's intellect, understanding, and judgment, until one sifts the truth from the false.

Baḥya ibn Paquda cited two things that  prohibited to the king—multiplying wives and multiplying silver and gold—as examples of an excess of what would otherwise be permissible things, where one crosses the border from the sufficient to the superfluous, for which one has no need. Thus, Baḥya reasoned that the Torah warns against excess in sexual relations, possessions, and accumulation of money.

Deuteronomy chapter 18
Baḥya ibn Paquda read , "You shall be perfect with the Lord your God," to mean that one should aim to make one's exterior and interior selves equal and consistent in the service of God, so that the testimony of the heart, tongue, and limbs are alike and support and confirm each other.

Deuteronomy chapter 19

Deuteronomy chapter 20

Rashi wrote that  spoke only of optional war, as  makes explicit that it applied only "to all the cities that are very far away from you." Maimonides, however, taught that  applied to both optional and obligatory wars, and neither was to be waged against anyone until they were offered the opportunity of peace. Maimonides wrote that if the enemy accepted the offer of peace and committed itself to the fulfillment of the seven Noahide commandments, then none of them were to be killed. Rather, they were to be subjugated as  states: "They shall be your subjects and serve you." Similarly, Nahmanides taught that the call for peace applied even to an obligatory war and required the Israelites to offer peace terms even to the seven nations of Canaan. Rather, Nahmanides taught that the difference between obligatory and optional wars applied when the enemy did not make peace and continued to make war. Then, in the case of "the cities which are very far off" (in the words of ),  commanded the Israelites to "smite every male thereof" and keep alive the women and children, while in "the cities of these peoples" (in the words of ), that is, the seven nations of Canaan, in the event that they refused the offer of peace,  commanded the Israelites to kill even women and children. Nahmanides argued that Solomon did so in accordance with the Law, for these Canaanites accepted the observance of the seven Noahide commandments. Nahmanides argued that as it is clear that Solomon was able to draft them as laborers, he also had power to have killed them, but it was apparently permissible to let them live, as Nahmanides had argued.

In modern interpretation
The parashah is discussed in these modern sources:

Deuteronomy chapter 16
Professor Gerhard von Rad of Heidelberg University in the mid-20th-century argued that the ordinances for standardizing the cult and establishing only one sanctuary are the most distinctive feature in Deuteronomy's new arrangements for ordering Israel's life before God. Von Rad cited ; ; ; ; ; ; and  among a small number of “centralizing laws” that he argued belong closely together and were a special, later stratum in Deuteronomy. Von Rad argued that these texts indicate that Israel's cult had become completely lacking in unity, celebrating at former Canaanite shrines intended for Baal. The instructions to centralize the cult sprang from the conviction that for a cult in a different country, its shrines could no longer be reincorporated into the ordinances of a pure faith in God. Jewish educators Sorel Goldberg Loeb and Barbara Binder Kadden wrote that Von Rad saw the Book of Deuteronomy and the discussion of sacrifices in particular as a way of getting the Israelites back on track, as the Israelites had been influenced by other nations whose worship habits did not coincide with the Israelite belief system.

Bright doubted that an author would have portrayed the revered ancestor as performing actions of this kind at a time when his readers would have regarded them as shocking. Bright concluded that the composition of the Jahwist source thus likely predated the Babylonian captivity, as the source so often depicted the Patriarchs as performing actions forbidden in Israelite law by the time of the exile.

Deuteronomy chapter 17

A then-recent precursor of the Constitution's provision appeared in 1776 in the Laws of Virginia, which provided that defendants be "convicted of open deed by the evidence of two sufficient and lawful witnesses, or their own voluntary confession." At the Constitutional Convention, the requirement for two witnesses first appeared in the first draft of the Constitution presented on August 6, 1787. During debate on August 20, 1787, John Dickinson of Delaware questioned what was meant by the "testimony of two witnesses" and whether they were to be witnesses to the same overt act or to different overt acts. The Convention consequently voted to insert the words "to the same overt act" after "two witnesses." Benjamin Franklin supported the amendment, arguing that prosecutions for treason were virulent and perjury too easily made use of against innocent defendants. In The Federalist Papers, Alexander Hamilton cited the requirement for two witnesses to establish treason as one of several provisions in the Constitution that enumerate rights that, taken together, amounted to a bill of rights.

Deuteronomy chapter 18

 set forth tests to determine whether a prophet is true. Professor Robert A. Oden, formerly of Dartmouth College, cited  as a parade example for the proposition that the test of prophets' legitimacy was whether the prophets asserted that they “stood in the council of the Lord.” Oden cited  to document what prophets did. Oden taught that prophets (1) were messengers of God, (2) interpreted events close at hand, (3) declared holy war, (4) made kings, (5) criticized kings, (6) upheld old traditions, and (7) prosecuted covenant violations.

Deuteronomy chapter 19
Roman law and German law started from the blood feud, which led to the composition, at first optional, then compulsory, by which the feud was bought off. Holmes reported that in Anglo-Saxon practice, the feud was pretty well broken up by the time of William the Conqueror. The killings and house-burnings of an earlier day became the appeals of mayhem and arson, and then the legal actions now familiar to lawyers.

Kugel concluded that the Deuteronomist was closely connected to the world of wisdom literature.

Deuteronomy chapter 20

Kugel reported that some modern interpreters deduced that the editor responsible for inserting the Dinah story in Genesis was particularly connected with Deuteronomy or at least familiar with its laws.

In critical analysis

Some scholars who follow the Documentary Hypothesis consider all of the parashah to have been part of the original Deuteronomic Code (sometimes abbreviated Dtn) that the first Deuteronomistic historian (sometimes abbreviated Dtr 1) included in the edition of Deuteronomy that existed during Josiah's time.

Commandments
According to Sefer ha-Chinuch, there are 14 positive and 27 negative commandments in the parashah.
To appoint judges
Not to plant a tree in the sanctuary
Not to erect a column in a public place of worship
Not to offer a temporarily blemished animal
To act according to the ruling of the Sanhedrin
Not to deviate from the word of the Sanhedrin
To appoint a king from Israel
Not to appoint a foreigner
The king must not have too many horses.
Not to dwell permanently in Egypt
The king must not have too many wives.
The king must not have too much silver and gold.
The king must have a separate Torah for himself.
The Tribe of Levi must not be given a portion of the land in Israel; rather they are given cities in which to dwell.
The Levites must not take a share in the spoils of war.
To give the shoulder, two cheeks, and stomach of slaughtered animals to a Kohen
To set aside the tithe for the Kohen (Terumah Gedolah)
To give the first shearing of sheep to a Kohen
The priests' work shifts must be equal during holidays.
Not to go into a trance to foresee events
Not to perform acts of magic
Not to mutter incantations
Not to consult a medium (ov)
Not to consult a wizard (yidoni)
Not to attempt to contact the dead
To listen to the prophet speaking in God's Name
Not to prophesize falsely in the name of God
Not to prophesize in the name of an idol
Not to be afraid of putting the false prophet to death
To designate cities of refuge and prepare routes of access
A judge must not pity the murderer or assaulter at the trial.
Not to move a boundary marker to steal someone's property
Not to accept testimony from a lone witness
To punish the false witnesses as they tried to punish the defendant
Not to panic and retreat during battle
To appoint a priest to speak with the soldiers during the war
To offer peace terms to the inhabitants of a city while holding siege, and treat them according to the Torah if they accept the terms
Not to let any of the people of the seven Canaanite nations remain alive

Not to destroy fruit trees even during the siege
To break the neck of a calf by the river valley following an unsolved murder
Not to work nor plant that river valley

Haftarah
The haftarah is the fourth in the cycle of seven haftarot of consolation after Tisha B'Av, leading up to Rosh Hashanah.

Notes

Further reading
The parashah has parallels or is discussed in these sources:

Ancient

Code of Hammurabi 23–24. Babylonia, Circa 1780 BCE. In e.g. James B. Pritchard. Ancient Near Eastern Texts Relating to the Old Testament, pages 163, 167. Princeton, New Jersey: Princeton University Press, 1969. (unsolved killing).
Hittite laws, 6. Hittite Empire, circa 1600–1100 BCE. In e.g. James B. Pritchard. Ancient Near Eastern Texts Relating to the Old Testament, pages 188, 189. Princeton, New Jersey: Princeton University Press, 1969. (unsolved killing).

Biblical
 (not to go to Egypt);  (baetyl).
 (baetyls).
 (Molech);  (Molech).
 (worshipping sun, moon, stars).
 (baetyl).
 (kings).
 (son pass through fire);  (children pass through fire);  (son pass through fire);  (Molech).
 (false prophets);  (Molech or king).
 (child sacrifice);  (worshipping sun, moon, stars);  (duties of kings);  (assessing prophets);  (judging prophets by results);  (Molech);  (judging prophets by results);  (not to go to Egypt);  (Molech or Malcam).
 (sun worship);  (true and false prophets);  (sacrificing children);  (king seeking horses in Egypt);  (sacrifice of sons).
 (baetyl).
 (Molech or king).
 (false prophets).
 (Molech).
 (God avenges blood);  (clearing us from hidden faults);  (some trust in horses);  (God is with me);  (false witnesses risen up);  (dedication of house);  (the commandment to destroy the Canaanites);  (meditation on the law all the day);  (judgment from Jerusalem).
 (worshipping sun, moon).
 (judges and Levites);  (children pass through fire).

Early nonrabbinic
Josephus, Antiquities of the Jews 4:8:14–17, 33, 41 . Circa 93–94. In, e.g., The Works of Josephus: Complete and Unabridged, New Updated Edition. Translated by William Whiston, pages 117–18, 122–23. Peabody, Massachusetts: Hendrickson Publishers, 1987.
Matthew  (false prophets);  (evidence of two or three witnesses). Circa 70–100 CE.
Acts of the Apostles  (Molech).

Classical rabbinic
Mishnah: Peah 8:9; Demai 4:10; Sheviit 10:8; Terumot 1:1–11:10; Challah 4:9; Bikkurim 2:10; Beitzah 1:6; Yevamot 15:3; Sotah 6:3; 7:2, 8; 8:1–9:9; Bava Batra 3:4; 1:1–11:6; 2:1–8; Chullin 10:1; 11:1–2; Parah 1:1. Land of Israel, circa 200 CE. In, e.g., The Mishnah: A New Translation. Translated by Jacob Neusner, pages 35, 79, 92, 157, 172, 292, 373, 457, 459–64, 564, 583–84, 586–87, 594, 598, 607–12, 614, 616, 784–86. New Haven, Connecticut: Yale University Press, 1988.
Tosefta: Tosefta Terumot 1:1–10:18; Sanhedrin 1:1–14:17; Makkot 1:1–11; 2:1–3:10. Land of Israel, circa 250 CE. In, e.g., The Tosefta: Translated from the Hebrew, with a New Introduction. Translated by Jacob Neusner, volume 1, pages 85, 131–202, 339, 438, 527, 544, 610, 629, 864–67, 870, 872–73; volume 2, pages 957, 992–94, 1143–97, 1199–208, 1214, 1220, 1230, 1232, 1237, 1293, 1297, 1402–03, 1409–10. Peabody, Massachusetts: Hendrickson Publishers, 2002.
Sifre to Deuteronomy 144:1–210:3. Land of Israel, circa 250–350 CE. In, e.g., Sifre to Deuteronomy: An Analytical Translation. Translated by Jacob Neusner, volume 2, pages 3–108. Atlanta: Scholars Press, 1987.
Jerusalem Talmud: Berakhot 12a, 94b; Peah 54a, 73a; Sheviit 45b, 85a; Terumot 1a–107a; Maasrot 2a; Maaser Sheni 57b; Challah 46b; Shabbat 16a, 55b; Shekalim 40b, 43b; Yoma 13b, 41b; Sukkah 28b; Rosh Hashanah 19a; Taanit 20b; Megillah 6a, 12b, 15a–b; Moed Katan 10b; Chagigah 5a; Yevamot 4b, 63b, 65a, 83a, 88a; Ketubot 19a; Nedarim 31a, 37a; Nazir 16a; Sotah 1a, 20a, 26b, 30a, 36b–48a; Gittin 20a; Bava Kamma 30b; Sanhedrin 1a–75a; Makkot 1b, 4a–10a; Shevuot 23b–24a; Avodah Zarah 1a, 14b, 26b, 33b; Horayot 1b, 5a, 13a–b, 15a. Tiberias, Land of Israel, circa 400 CE. In, e.g., Talmud Yerushalmi. Edited by Chaim Malinowitz, Yisroel Simcha Schorr, and Mordechai Marcus, volumes 1–3, 6b–11, 13–14, 20–22, 24–25, 27–31, 33–34, 37–38, 41, 44–49. Brooklyn: Mesorah Publications, 2005–2020.
Genesis Rabbah 1:4; 13:14; 15:4; 17:4; 26:6; 34:8; 43:2; 44:14; 47:10; 53:1; 55:3; 65:1, 11; 75:13; 80:1; 94:3, 9; 95:3. Land of Israel, 5th century. In, e.g., Midrash Rabbah: Genesis. Translated by Harry Freedman and Maurice Simon, volume 1, pages 6–7, 108, 121, 135, 214–15, 271–72, 352–53, 369–70, 404–05, 461, 483; volume 2, pages 581, 586–87, 699, 735, 870, 877, 882. London: Soncino Press, 1939.

Babylonian Talmud: Berakhot 18b, 19b, 22a; Shabbat 19a, 23a, 25b, 33a, 56b, 67b, 75a–b, 84b–85a, 94b, 127b, 129a, 140b; Eruvin 31b, 35b, 37b, 41b; Pesachim 12a, 26a, 33a, 35b, 53a, 55b, 112b, 113b; Yoma 22b–23a, 25a, 37a, 60a, 74a, 83a; Sukkah 3a–b, 46a, 51b, 55b–56a; Beitzah 3b, 10b, 12b, 19b; Rosh Hashanah 4b–5a, 6b, 21b, 24b, 25b; Taanit 7a, 31a; Megillah 5a, 20b–21a, 28a, 32a; Moed Katan 5a, 8a, 20a, 24b; Chagigah 2a, 8b, 16b–17a; Yevamot 31b, 45b, 63b, 90b, 94a, 99b, 100b, 101b–02a, 104a; Ketubot 15a, 16b, 17a, 19b, 25a, 28b, 32b–33b, 37b, 45b, 87b, 103b, 105a–b; Nedarim 31a, 38a, 87b–88a; Nazir 47b; Sotah 2a, 3b, 7b–8a, 17b, 23b, 31b–32a, 35b, 38a–b, 41b–47b; Gittin 2b, 59b, 71a, 90a; Kiddushin 13b, 18a, 29b, 32a–b, 37b, 56b–57a, 67b, 69a, 76b; Bava Kamma 4b–5a, 24a, 32a–33a, 44b, 66a, 70a–b, 72b, 73b, 74b, 75b, 82b, 84a, 86a–b, 88a, 89a, 90b, 91b, 105b, 109b, 110b, 114a, 115a; Bava Metzia 30a; Bava Batra 3b, 23b, 31b, 56b, 91b 91b, 100b, 123b, 127a, 150a, 155b, 160b, 165b; Sanhedrin 2a–113b; Makkot 2a–13a, 22a, 24a; Shevuot 27b, 30a, 31a, 32a, 34a, 40a; Avodah Zarah 8b, 18a, 23a, 29b, 43b, 52a, 74a; Horayot 2a, 4a, 6a, 11a–12a; Zevachim 23b, 36a, 46a, 54b, 70b, 73a, 88b; Menachot 6a, 18b, 34a, 36a, 38a, 67a, 74a, 90b, 93a, 101b; Chullin 7b, 11a–b, 23b–24a, 37b, 75b, 79b, 81b–82a, 117a–b, 120b, 130a–33a, 134b–38a; Bekhorot 11b, 12b, 14b, 17b, 35b, 45b; Arakhin 11a, 30b; Keritot 3b–4a, 5b–6a, 23b–24a, 25a, 26a; Meilah 11b; Tamid 28b; Niddah 8b, 19a, 50a, 51a–b, 57a. (Sasanian Empire, 6th century). In, e.g., Talmud Bavli. Edited by Yisroel Simcha Schorr, Chaim Malinowitz, and Mordechai Marcus, 72 volumes. Brooklyn: Mesorah Publications, 2006.

Medieval
Deuteronomy Rabbah 5:1–15. Land of Israel, 9th century. In, e.g., Midrash Rabbah: Leviticus. Translated by Harry Freedman and Maurice Simon. London: Soncino Press, 1939.
Rashi. Commentary. Deuteronomy 16–21. Troyes, France, late 11th century. In, e.g., Rashi. The Torah: With Rashi's Commentary Translated, Annotated, and Elucidated. Translated and annotated by Yisrael Isser Zvi Herczeg, volume 5, pages 181–220. Brooklyn: Mesorah Publications, 1997.

Rashbam. Commentary on the Torah. Troyes, early 12th century. In, e.g., Rashbam's Commentary on Deuteronomy: An Annotated Translation. Edited and translated by Martin I. Lockshin, pages 107–28. Providence, Rhode Island: Brown Judaic Studies, 2004.
Judah Halevi. Kuzari. 3:31, 39, 41. Toledo, Spain, 1130–1140. In, e.g., Jehuda Halevi. Kuzari: An Argument for the Faith of Israel. Introduction by Henry Slonimsky, pages 165, 170–71, 173. New York: Schocken, 1964.
Abraham ibn Ezra. Commentary on the Torah. Mid-12th century. In, e.g., Ibn Ezra's Commentary on the Pentateuch: Deuteronomy (Devarim). Translated and annotated by H. Norman Strickman and Arthur M. Silver, volume 5, pages 116–43. New York: Menorah Publishing Company, 2001.

Moses Maimonides. Mishneh Torah. Hilchot Melakhim (The Laws of Kings). Egypt. Circa 1170–1180. In, e.g., Mishneh Torah: Sefer Shoftim: Hilchot Sanhedrin, Edut, Mamrim, Evel, Melachim. Translated by Eliyahu Touger. New York: Moznaim, Publishing, 1990.
Maimonides. The Guide for the Perplexed, part 1, chapters 36, 54; part 2, chapter 34; part 3, chapters 8, 35, 37, 39–41, 45, 49–50. Cairo, Egypt, 1190. In, e.g., Moses Maimonides. The Guide for the Perplexed. Translated by Michael Friedländer, pages 51–52, 77, 223, 264, 294, 330, 333, 339, 343, 345, 357, 375, 382–83. New York: Dover Publications, 1956.
Hezekiah ben Manoah. Hizkuni. France, circa 1240. In, e.g., Chizkiyahu ben Manoach. Chizkuni: Torah Commentary. Translated and annotated by Eliyahu Munk, volume 4, pages 1125–46. Jerusalem: Ktav Publishers, 2013.
Nachmanides. Commentary on the Torah. Jerusalem, circa 1270. In, e.g., Ramban (Nachmanides): Commentary on the Torah: Deuteronomy. Translated by Charles B. Chavel, volume 5, pages 192–246. New York: Shilo Publishing House, 1976.
Bahya ben Asher. Commentary on the Torah. Spain, early 14th century. In, e.g., Midrash Rabbeinu Bachya: Torah Commentary by Rabbi Bachya ben Asher. Translated and annotated by Eliyahu Munk, volume 7, pages 2551–610. Jerusalem: Lambda Publishers, 2003.
Isaac ben Moses Arama. Akedat Yizhak (The Binding of Isaac). Late 15th century. In, e.g., Yitzchak Arama. Akeydat Yitzchak: Commentary of Rabbi Yitzchak Arama on the Torah. Translated and condensed by Eliyahu Munk, volume 2, pages 849–64. New York, Lambda Publishers, 2001.

Modern
Isaac Abravanel. Commentary on the Torah. Italy, between 1492 and 1509. In, e.g., Abarbanel: Selected Commentaries on the Torah: Volume 5: Devarim/Deuteronomy. Translated and annotated by Israel Lazar, pages 80–106. Brooklyn: CreateSpace, 2015. And excerpted in, e.g., Abarbanel on the Torah: Selected Themes. Translated by Avner Tomaschoff, pages 421–40. Jerusalem: Jewish Agency for Israel, 2007.
Obadiah ben Jacob Sforno. Commentary on the Torah. Venice, 1567. In, e.g., Sforno: Commentary on the Torah. Translation and explanatory notes by Raphael Pelcovitz, pages 916–33. Brooklyn: Mesorah Publications, 1997.
Moshe Alshich. Commentary on the Torah. Safed, circa 1593. In, e.g., Moshe Alshich. Midrash of Rabbi Moshe Alshich on the Torah. Translated and annotated by Eliyahu Munk, volume 3, pages 1043–62. New York, Lambda Publishers, 2000.

Avraham Yehoshua Heschel. Commentaries on the Torah. Cracow, Poland, mid 17th century. Compiled as Chanukat HaTorah. Edited by Chanoch Henoch Erzohn. Piotrkow, Poland, 1900. In Avraham Yehoshua Heschel. Chanukas HaTorah: Mystical Insights of Rav Avraham Yehoshua Heschel on Chumash. Translated by Avraham Peretz Friedman, pages 306–07. Southfield, Michigan: Targum Press/Feldheim Publishers, 2004.
Thomas Hobbes. Leviathan, 3:37, 40, 41, 42; Review & Conclusion. England, 1651. Reprint edited by C. B. Macpherson, pages 476–77, 506, 518, 543, 548, 586–87, 724. Harmondsworth, England: Penguin Classics, 1982.

Chaim ibn Attar. Ohr ha-Chaim. Venice, 1742. In Chayim ben Attar. Or Hachayim: Commentary on the Torah. Translated by Eliyahu Munk, volume 5, pages 1882–904. Brooklyn: Lambda Publishers, 1999.
Moses Mendelssohn. Sefer Netivot Hashalom (The “Bi’ur,” The Explanation). Berlin, 1780–1783. In Moses Mendelssohn: Writings on Judaism, Christianity, and the Bible. Edited Michah Gottlieb, pages 228–29. Waltham, Massachusetts: Brandeis University Press, 2011.
Moses Mendelssohn. Jerusalem, § 2. Berlin, 1783. In Jerusalem: Or on Religious Power and Judaism. Translated by Allan Arkush; introduction and commentary by Alexander Altmann, page 129. Hanover, N.H.: Brandeis Univ. Press, 1983.
United States Constitution, Article 2, Section 1, Clause 5. Philadelphia, 1787. (prohibition on foreign rulers).

Samuel David Luzzatto (Shadal). Commentary on the Torah. Padua, 1871. In, e.g., Samuel David Luzzatto. Torah Commentary. Translated and annotated by Eliyahu Munk, volume 4, pages 1199–221. New York: Lambda Publishers, 2012.

Yehudah Aryeh Leib Alter. Sefat Emet. Góra Kalwaria (Ger), Poland, before 1906. Excerpted in The Language of Truth: The Torah Commentary of Sefat Emet. Translated and interpreted by Arthur Green, pages 309–14. Philadelphia: Jewish Publication Society, 1998. Reprinted 2012.
Hermann Cohen. Religion of Reason: Out of the Sources of Judaism. Translated with an introduction by Simon Kaplan; introductory essays by Leo Strauss, pages 417, 429. New York: Ungar, 1972. Reprinted Atlanta: Scholars Press, 1995. Originally published as Religion der Vernunft aus den Quellen des Judentums. Leipzig: Gustav Fock, 1919.
Erwin R. Goodenough. “Kingship in Early Israel.” Journal of Biblical Literature, volume 48, number 3/4 (1929): pages 169–205.
Alexander Alan Steinbach. Sabbath Queen: Fifty-four Bible Talks to the Young Based on Each Portion of the Pentateuch, pages 151–54. New York: Behrman's Jewish Book House, 1936.

Joseph Reider. The Holy Scriptures: Deuteronomy with Commentary, pages 165–97. Philadelphia: Jewish Publication Society, 1937.
Thomas Mann. Joseph and His Brothers. Translated by John E. Woods, pages 336–38, 447, 736. New York: Alfred A. Knopf, 2005. Originally published as Joseph und seine Brüder. Stockholm: Bermann-Fischer Verlag, 1943.
Geneva Convention relative to the Protection of Civilian Persons in Time of War. Geneva: 1949. (protecting civilians in a war zone, outlawing the practice of total war).
John Gray. “Canaanite Kingship in Theory and Practice.” Vetus Testamentum, volume 2, number 3 (July 1952): pages 193–220.
Isaac Mendelsohn. “Samuel's Denunciation of Kingship in the Light of the Akkadian Documents from Ugarit.” Bulletin of the American Schools of Oriental Research, number 143 (October 1956): pages 17–22.

Morris Adler. The World of the Talmud, pages 30–31. B'nai B'rith Hillel Foundations, 1958. Reprinted Kessinger Publishing, 2007.
Haim H. Cohn. “Privilege against Self-Incrimination: Israel.” The Journal of Criminal Law, Criminology, and Police Science, volume 51, number 2 (July–August 1960): pages 175–78.
T.C.G. Thornton. “Charismatic Kingship in Israel and Judah.” The Journal of Theological Studies, new series, volume 14, number 1 (April 1963): pages 1–11.

Martin Buber. On the Bible: Eighteen studies, pages 80–92. New York: Schocken Books, 1968.
Barnabas Lindars. "Torah in Deuteronomy." In Words and Meanings: Essays Presented to David Winton Thomas. Edited by Peter R. Ackroyd and Barnabas Lindars, pages 117–36. Cambridge: Cambridge University Press, 1968.
David Daube. “One from among Your Brethen Shall You Set King over You.” Journal of Biblical Literature, volume 90, number 4 (December 1971): pages 480–81.
Peter C. Craigie. The Problem of War in the Old Testament, pages 10, 36, 45, 47, 57, 102. Grand Rapids, Michigan: William B. Eerdmans Publishing Company, 1978.
Nehama Leibowitz. Studies in Devarim: Deuteronomy, pages 160–208. Jerusalem: The World Zionist Organization, 1980.
Baruch Halpern. The Constitution of the Monarchy in Israel Leiden: Brill, 1981.
Gerald J. Blidstein. “The Monarchic Imperative in Rabbinic Perspective.” AJS Review, volume 7/8 (1982/1983): pages 15–39.
Pinchas H. Peli. Torah Today: A Renewed Encounter with Scripture, pages 217–19. Washington, D.C.: B'nai B'rith Books, 1987.
David Silber. “Kingship, Samuel and the Story of Hanna.” Tradition: A Journal of Orthodox Jewish Thought, volume 23, number 2 (winter 1988): pages 64–75.
Patrick D. Miller. Deuteronomy, pages 140–63. Louisville: John Knox Press, 1990.
Mark S. Smith. The Early History of God: Yahweh and the Other Deities in Ancient Israel, pages 80–81, 125, 127, 130, 133, 150. New York: HarperSanFrancisco, 1990.
David Polish. “Rabbinic Views on Kingship—A Study in Jewish Sovereignty.” Jewish Political Studies Review, volume 3, number 1/2 (Spring 1991): pages 67–90.
Rochelle L. Millen. “Isaac Abravanel's Concept of Monarchy.” Shofar, volume 10, number 3 (spring 1992): pages 47–61.
A Song of Power and the Power of Song: Essays on the Book of Deuteronomy. Edited by Duane L. Christensen. Winona Lake, Indiana: Eisenbrauns, 1993.
Judith S. Antonelli. "The Pursuit of Justice." In In the Image of God: A Feminist Commentary on the Torah, pages 439–54. Northvale, New Jersey: Jason Aronson, 1995.
Ellen Frankel. The Five Books of Miriam: A Woman's Commentary on the Torah, pages 267–70. New York: G. P. Putnam's Sons, 1996.
Jacob Milgrom. "Lex Talionis and the Rabbis: The Talmud reflects an uneasy rabbinic conscience toward the ancient law of talion, 'eye for eye, tooth for tooth.'" Bible Review, volume 12, number 2 (April 1996).

Jack R. Lundbom. “The Inclusio and Other Framing Devices in Deuteronomy I–XXVIII.” Vetus Testamentum, volume 46, number 3 (July 1996): pages 296–315.
W. Gunther Plaut. The Haftarah Commentary, pages 471–81. New York: UAHC Press, 1996.
Jeffrey H. Tigay. The JPS Torah Commentary: Deuteronomy: The Traditional Hebrew Text with the New JPS Translation, pages 160–93, 470–76. Philadelphia: Jewish Publication Society, 1996.
Sorel Goldberg Loeb and Barbara Binder Kadden. Teaching Torah: A Treasury of Insights and Activities, pages 316–21. Denver: A.R.E. Publishing, 1997.

Daniel J. Elazar. “The Historic and Contemporary Relationships between Halakhah and Mishpat Hamelukhah.” Jewish Political Studies Review, volume 10, number 3/4 (Fall 1998): pages 1–16.
Leon M. Mozeson. “Halakha and Democracy.” Tradition: A Journal of Orthodox Jewish Thought, volume 33, number 1 (fall 1998): pages 129–31.
Susan Fendrick. "Principles for Feminist Approaches to Torah." In The Women's Torah Commentary: New Insights from Women Rabbis on the 54 Weekly Torah Portions. Edited by Elyse Goldstein, pages 358–63. Woodstock, Vermont: Jewish Lights Publishing, 2000.
“Kings,” “Priests,” and “Prophets.” In The Jewish Political Tradition: Volume 1: Authority. Edited by Michael Walzer, Menachem Lorberbaum, Nohan J. Zohar, and Yair Lorberbaum, pages 108–243. New Haven: Yale University Press, 2000.
Richard D. Nelson. “Deuteronomy.” In The HarperCollins Bible Commentary. Edited by James L. Mays, pages 203–06. New York: HarperCollins Publishers, revised edition, 2000.
Walter Brueggemann. Abingdon Old Testament Commentaries: Deuteronomy, pages 178–222. Nashville: Abingdon Press, 2001.
Timothy M. Willis. The Elders of the City: A Study of the Elders-Laws in Deuteronomy. Atlanta: Society of Biblical Literature, 2001.
Lainie Blum Cogan and Judy Weiss. Teaching Haftarah: Background, Insights, and Strategies, pages 304–13. Denver: A.R.E. Publishing, 2002.
Patricia Dutcher-Walls. “The Circumscription of the King: Deuteronomy 17:16–17 in Its Ancient Social Context.” Journal of Biblical Literature, volume 121, number 4 (winter 2002): pages 601–16.
Michael Fishbane. The JPS Bible Commentary: Haftarot, pages 295–301. Philadelphia: Jewish Publication Society, 2002.
John J. Collins. “The Zeal of Phinehas: The Bible and the Legitimation of Violence.” Journal of Biblical Literature, volume 122, number 1 (Spring 2003): pages 3–21. (the ban in ).
Alan Lew. This Is Real and You Are Completely Unprepared: The Days of Awe as a Journey of Transformation, pages 65, 76–86. Boston: Little, Brown and Co., 2003.
Joseph Telushkin. The Ten Commandments of Character: Essential Advice for Living an Honorable, Ethical, Honest Life, pages 275–78. New York: Bell Tower, 2003.
Robert Alter. The Five Books of Moses: A Translation with Commentary, pages 961–81. New York: W.W. Norton & Co., 2004.
Pamela Barmash. “Blood Feud and State Control: Differing Legal Institutions for the Remedy of Homicide During the Second and First Millennia B.C.E.” Journal of Near Eastern Studies. Volume 63 (July 2004): pages 183–99.
Cindy Enger. “Haftarat Shoftim: Isaiah 51:12–52:12.” In The Women's Haftarah Commentary: New Insights from Women Rabbis on the 54 Weekly Haftarah Portions, the 5 Megillot & Special Shabbatot. Edited by Elyse Goldstein, pages 230–32. Woodstock, Vermont: Jewish Lights Publishing, 2004.
Bernard M. Levinson. "Deuteronomy." In The Jewish Study Bible. Edited by Adele Berlin and Marc Zvi Brettler, pages 403–14. New York: Oxford University Press, 2004.
Professors on the Parashah: Studies on the Weekly Torah Reading Edited by Leib Moscovitz, pages 323–27. Jerusalem: Urim Publications, 2005.
W. Gunther Plaut. The Torah: A Modern Commentary: Revised Edition. Revised edition edited by David E.S. Stern, pages 1292–319. New York: Union for Reform Judaism, 2006.
Jeffrey Stackert. “Why Does Deuteronomy Legislate Cities of Refuge? Asylum in the Covenant Collection (Exodus 21:12-14) and Deuteronomy (19:1-13).” Journal of Biblical Literature, volume 125, number 1 (Spring, 2006): pages 23–49.
Suzanne A. Brody. "A Heavenly Ruler." In Dancing in the White Spaces: The Yearly Torah Cycle and More Poems, page 106. Shelbyville, Kentucky: Wasteland Press, 2007.
James L. Kugel. How To Read the Bible: A Guide to Scripture, Then and Now, pages 39, 131, 150, 174, 193, 254, 309–12, 340, 438–41, 446, 449, 579, 628. New York: Free Press, 2007.
Mark O'Brien. “Deuteronomy 16.18–18.22: Meeting the Challenge of Towns and Nations.” Journal for the Study of the Old Testament, volume 33, number 2 (December 2008): pages 155–72.
The Torah: A Women's Commentary. Edited by Tamara Cohn Eskenazi and Andrea L. Weiss, pages 1141–64. New York: URJ Press, 2008.
Writing and Reading War: Rhetoric, Gender, and Ethics in Biblical and Modern Contexts. Edited by Brad E. Kelle and Frank Richtel Ames. Society of Biblical Literature, 2008.
Julia Watts Belser. “Setting Ourselves Judges: Parashat Shoftim (Deuteronomy 16:18–21:9).” In Torah Queeries: Weekly Commentaries on the Hebrew Bible. Edited by Gregg Drinkwater, Joshua Lesser, and David Shneer; foreword by Judith Plaskow, pages 250–53. New York: New York University Press, 2009.
Eugene E. Carpenter. "Deuteronomy." In Zondervan Illustrated Bible Backgrounds Commentary. Edited by John H. Walton, volume 1, pages 480–91. Grand Rapids, Michigan: Zondervan, 2009.
Reuven Hammer. Entering Torah: Prefaces to the Weekly Torah Portion, pages 275–79. New York: Gefen Publishing House, 2009.
Raymond Westbrook and Bruce Wells. Everyday Law in Biblical Israel: An Introduction. Louisville, Kentucky: Westminster John Knox Press, 2009.
Jonathan P. Burnside. "A 'Missing Case' in the Biblical Laws of Homicide and Asylum?" Vetus Testamentum, volume 60, number 2 (2010): pages 288–91.
Jonathan P. Burnside. "Exodus and Asylum: Uncovering the Relationship between Biblical Law and Narrative." Journal for the Study of the Old Testament, volume 34, number 3 (March 2010): pages 243–66..
Sheldon M. Finkelstein. "A Tale of Two Witnesses: The Constitution's Two-Witness Rule and the Talmud Sanhedrin." Litigation, volume 36, number 4 (summer 2010): pages 13–17.
Eric Nelson. The Hebrew Republic: Jewish Sources and the Transformation of European Political Thought, pages 26–56. Cambridge, Massachusetts: Harvard University Press, 2010.

William G. Dever. The Lives of Ordinary People in Ancient Israel: When Archaeology and the Bible Intersect, pages 137, 192. Grand Rapids, Michigan: William B. Eerdmans Publishing Company, 2012.
Shmuel Herzfeld. "The Five-Minute Sermon." In Fifty-Four Pick Up: Fifteen-Minute Inspirational Torah Lessons, pages 273–78. Jerusalem: Gefen Publishing House, 2012.
Richard McDonald. "The 'Altar of the Lord Your God' in Deuteronomy 16.21: Central Altar or Local Altars?" Journal for the Study of the Old Testament, volume 37, number 4 (June 2013): pages 453–72.
David Kalb. “In Pursuit of Justice: Not only should we pursue righteous goals, our methods in achieving those goals must be righteous as well.” The Jerusalem Report, volume 25, number 11 (September 8, 2014): page 47.

Robert Deutsch. "JPFs: More Questions than Answers." Biblical Archaeology Review, volume 40, number 5 (September/October 2014).
Art Swift. "Americans: 'Eye for an Eye' Top Reason for Death Penalty." Gallup. (October 23, 2014).
Shlomo Riskin. Torah Lights: Devarim: Moses Bequeaths Legacy, History, and Covenant, pages 159–202. New Milford, Connecticut: Maggid Books, 2014.
The Commentators' Bible: The Rubin JPS Miqra'ot Gedolot: Deuteronomy. Edited, translated, and annotated by Michael Carasik, pages 113–41. Philadelphia: Jewish Publication Society, 2015.

Jonathan Sacks. Lessons in Leadership: A Weekly Reading of the Jewish Bible, pages 263–67. New Milford, Connecticut: Maggid Books, 2015.
Richard J. Bautch. “The Altar Not Destroyed in Deuteronomy 16.21.” Journal for the Study of the Old Testament, volume 40, number 3 (March 2016): pages 321–36.
Jonathan Sacks. Essays on Ethics: A Weekly Reading of the Jewish Bible, pages 299–304. New Milford, Connecticut: Maggid Books, 2016.
Bill Dauster. "Mixed Feelings About Kingship," Congregation Beth El Scroll , July–August 2017, page 6.
Shai Held. The Heart of Torah, Volume 2: Essays on the Weekly Torah Portion: Leviticus, Numbers, and Deuteronomy, pages 240–49. Philadelphia: Jewish Publication Society, 2017.
Steven Levy and Sarah Levy. The JPS Rashi Discussion Torah Commentary, pages 163–66. Philadelphia: Jewish Publication Society, 2017.
Pekka Pitkänen. “Ancient Israelite Population Economy: Ger, Toshav, Nakhri and Karat as Settler Colonial Categories.” Journal for the Study of the Old Testament, volume 42, number 2 (December 2017): pages 139–53.
Harald Samuel. “Competing Competencies: The Struggle for Authority in Deut 17:8–13 in Comparative Perspective.” In Debating Authority: Concepts of Leadership in the Pentateuch and the Former Prophets. Edited by Katharina Pyschny and Sarah Schulz, pages 178–92. Berlin: De Gruyter, 2018.
Jonathan Sacks. Covenant & Conversation: A Weekly Reading of the Jewish Bible: Deuteronomy: Renewal of the Sinai Covenant, pages 149–80. New Milford, Connecticut: Maggid Books, 2019.
Cat Quine. "The Host of Heaven and the Divine Army: A Reassessment." Journal of Biblical Literature, volume 138, number 4 (2019): pages 741–55.
Carsten Vang. “The Non-Prophetic Background for the King Law in Deut 17:14–20.” In Paradigm Change in Pentateuchal Research. Edited by Matthias Armgardt, Benjamin Kilchör, and Markus Zehnder, pages 207–23. Wiesbaden: Otto Harrassowitz, 2019.

External links

Texts
Masoretic text and 1917 JPS translation
Hear the parashah chanted
Hear the parashah read in Hebrew

Commentaries

Academy for Jewish Religion, New York
Aish.com
Akhlah: The Jewish Children's Learning Network
Aleph Beta Academy
American Jewish University—Ziegler School of Rabbinic Studies
Anshe Emes Synagogue, Los Angeles
Ari Goldwag
Ascent of Safed
Bar-Ilan University
Chabad.org
eparsha.com
G-dcast
The Israel Koschitzky Virtual Beit Midrash
Jewish Agency for Israel
Jewish Theological Seminary
Mechon Hadar
MyJewishLearning.com
Ohr Sameach
Orthodox Union
OzTorah, Torah from Australia
Oz Ve Shalom—Netivot Shalom
Pardes from Jerusalem
Professor James L. Kugel
Professor Michael Carasik
Rabbi Dov Linzer
Rabbi Fabian Werbin
Rabbi Jonathan Sacks
RabbiShimon.com
Rabbi Shlomo Riskin
Rabbi Shmuel Herzfeld
Rabbi Stan Levin
Reconstructionist Judaism 
Sephardic Institute
Shiur.com
613.org Jewish Torah Audio
Teach613.org, Torah Education at Cherry Hill
Tanach Study Center
TheTorah.com
Torah from Dixie
Torah.org
TorahVort.com
Union for Reform Judaism
United Synagogue of Conservative Judaism
What's Bothering Rashi?
Yeshivat Chovevei Torah
Yeshiva University

Weekly Torah readings in Elul
Weekly Torah readings from Deuteronomy